Masami Taniguchi (谷口雅美 Taniguchi Masami, born September 17, 1976) is a Japanese volleyball player who plays for JT Marvelous.

Profiles
She became a volleyball player at 10 years old.
She served as the captain until 2006.
In JT Marvelous, her nickname is "The Taicho" which means the commander.

Clubs
  Miyazaki Nichidai High School
  Odakyu(1995–1999)
  Hitachi (1999–2001)
  JT Marvelous (2001-)

Awards

Individual 
2003 52nd Kurowashiki All Japan Volleyball Championship : Best 6
2004 53rd Kurowashiki All Japan Volleyball Championship : Excellent player award, Best 6
2007 2006-07 V.Premier League : Best 6
2008 57th Kurowashiki All Japan Volleyball Tournament : Excellent player award, Best 6

Team 
2003 Kurowashiki All Japan Volleyball Championship -  Runner-Up, with JT Marvelous.
2004 Kurowashiki All Japan Volleyball Championship -  Runner-Up, with JT Marvelous.
2006-2007 V.Premier League -  Runner-Up, with JT Marvelous.
2007 Kurowashiki All Japan Volleyball Championship -  Runner-Up, with JT Marvelous.
2009-2010 V.Premier League -  Runner-Up, with JT Marvelous.
2010 Kurowashiki All Japan Volleyball Tournament -  Runner-Up, with JT Marvelous.
2010-11 V.Premier League -  Champion, with JT Marvelous.
2011 Kurowashiki All Japan Volleyball Tournament -  Champion, with JT Marvelous.

National team

Senior team 
 National team (1999 and 2009)

Junior team 
 Youth national team (1992)
 Junior national team (1994-5)

References

External links
JT Marvelous Official Website

Japanese women's volleyball players
JT Marvelous players
Living people
People from Miyazaki Prefecture
1976 births